Calceolaria bentae is a species of plant in the Calceolariaceae family.

Location
It is endemic to Ecuador.

References

Endemic flora of Ecuador
bentae
Endangered plants
Taxonomy articles created by Polbot